The Patni are a mohit pattni community found in the states of Gujarat and Maharashtra in India and Sindh in Pakistan. The Patni are a trading community who are said to have originated and settled in the town of Patan in Gujarat. The community spread from Patan to the cities of Himatnagar, Veraval, Govindpura, Naodra, Kajli, Chorvad, Keshod, Junagadh and Jamnagar. They speak Vohra Gujarati and Kathiawari Hindi.

They largely dominate the fishing business in the port of Veraval in Gujarat and are engaged in transportation in Maharashtra. They are given the reservations and were regarded as Other Backward Class by the Central Government as of 2015.

History

The Mohit Patni are a trading community who are said to have settled in the town of Patan, the historic capital of Gujarat, during the rule of Sultan Mahmud Ghaznavi. They originated in the town of Prabhas Patan in Gujarat. The community spread from Patan to the cities of Veraval, Govindpura, Naodra, Kajli, Chorvad, Keshod and Junagadh. They speak Urdu and Kathiawari Hindi.The Patnis are essentially a community of traders and fish merchants, a profession they have practiced for generations. They are Sunni Muslims and their customs are similar to the other Gujarati Muslims communities. Presently they are situated in different parts of India, mainly in Veraval, Mumbai, Ahmedabad and to some extent in Hyderabad. After the independence of Pakistan in 1947 some members of the Patni Jamat migrated and settled mainly in Karachi. Many for business and education purpose people have migrated to abroad in places of Middle East, UAE, Saudi Arabia, Australia, Europe and North America.

In older days community was dealing in sea transportation by wooden country-craft and the owner of country craft were known as Vahanvatu and they were rich and went to Gulf as well as Africa. There were no mechanised vessels at the time and the journey and communication was tough with homeland. Thereafter time has changed and other communities have entered into this business with mechanised vessels and the traditional trades of wooden country craft ended.

Current circumstances

After 1990, many members of these community migrated outside Veraval, to Mumbai, Indore & Jalgaon. They started running small transport businesses, Hajibhai & Co was the first, which started in Malegaon in 1950's. Soon their transport businesses started running successfully. Much of their workforce were brought from their hometown Veraval. Soon, Patni settled in almost all big cities of Maharashtra. There are some Patni who have remarkable setup & big name in the transport world such as Arco Transport, Sarco Transport, Batco Logistics LLP, GMC Transport, Ashu Transport, Hajibhai Transport etc.

Today mainly Patni are doing fisheries business. In very large numbers they have fish shops, freezing plants for exporting fish to entire world, and also fishing boats. Veraval is very much known as "fisheries hub" in India and fortunately this trade is by and large under Patni community's control. Several Patni went to Kutchh region for Fishing .In early 2000s, some of the Patni also went to Gulf Nations & UK for employment.

"Samast Patni Jamat", a non-profit organization was formed by prominent community members in 1920. Since then, it also conducts Presidential election in every 3 years for the post of 'Patel'. 'Patel' is considered as executive functionary of the organization. The organization looks after the welfare of the Patni Jamat. Recent Elections took place in December 2020 in which Anwarbhai Mahmmadbhai Chauhan defeated Afzal Hussain. Anwarbhai Chauhan is 'Patel' since 2016.

It owns several town halls in the Patni-dominated areas in the various cities across India & Pakistan. It also runs several educational institutions in the city of Veraval like Sabana Girls High school, I.D Chauhan High School and M.Y English Medium School and also few schools in Karachi. It also runs several hospitals in Veraval and Patni Hospital in Karachi.

Clans in Patni Jamat

All these clans are of equal status and they marry each other, They are an indigenous community although they do marriages in the larger Sunni Muslim community.

The Patni Jamat is now made up of a number of clans, the main ones being the Varin, Sailor, Sassa, Mughal, Chauhan, Panja, Karvat, Kapadiya, Bhoda, Nakhwa, Khokhar, Sumra, Mevati, Chachya, Bagji, Agwan, Belim, khathaai, Diwan, Bandhani, Khan, Bekar Pirosh, Batli, Bharari, Chaga, Virbhar, Bagas, Chawda, Kothari, Khanjamal, Mirza, Kuresi, Karwat, Sherpakka, Chinai, Jangsai, Pyarji, Alvi, Sayanji, Kakasiya, Parmar, Jamadar, Babi, Kutub, Khamma, Malek, Gadai, Adhi, Piros, Tidu etc.

References

Social groups of Pakistan
Social groups of Gujarat
Muslim communities of India
Muslim communities of Gujarat